Leandro Fernández de Moratín  (10 March 1760 – 21 June 1828) was a Spanish dramatist, translator and neoclassical poet.

Biography
Moratín was born in Madrid the son of Nicolás Fernández de Moratín,  a major literary reformer in Spain from 1762 until his death in 1828.

Distrusting the teaching offered in Spain's universities at the time, Leandro grew up in the rich literary environment of his father and became an admirer of Enlightenment thought. In addition to translating works of Molière and William Shakespeare into Spanish, he himself was a major poet, dramatist and man of letters whose writings promoted the reformist ideas associated with the Spanish Enlightenment. Early in his career, he was supported by statesman and author Gaspar Melchor de Jovellanos, who, in 1787, arranged for him to study for a year in Paris. In 1792, the Spanish government provided the funds for him to travel to England in order to extend his education. In 1790 he published his first comedy El viejo y la niña (The Old Man and the Young Girl), a sombre work which attacked the consequences of arranged marriages between people of differing ages. Two years later, in 1792, he wrote the play La comedia nueva (The New Comedy), a dramatic attack on the extravagant plots used by other contemporary playwrights.

A supporter of Joseph Bonaparte, whose rule had allowed far more expression of liberal thinking than Spain's Bourbon monarch Carlos IV was willing to tolerate, Moratín was given the post of royal librarian. However, his 1805 comedy El sí de las niñas (The Maidens' Consent) was denounced upon the reinstatement of the Inquisition when Ferdinand VII regained the throne after the fall of the Bonapartes, and he had to abandon playwriting and was forced into exile in France.

Moratín died in Paris and was buried there in the Père Lachaise Cemetery. However, at the turn of the 20th century, his remains were brought back to Spain for interment in Madrid's Panteón de Hombres Ilustres (Pantheon of Illustrious Men).

References

External links
 
 

1760 births
1828 deaths
Writers from Madrid
Spanish dramatists and playwrights
Spanish male dramatists and playwrights
18th-century Spanish poets
Afrancesados
Age of Enlightenment
Members of the Royal Spanish Academy
Translators to Spanish
Royal Order of Spain members
Burials at Père Lachaise Cemetery
Spanish male poets
18th-century male writers